Lionel Alexander Tate (born January 30, 1987) is the youngest American citizen ever sentenced to life imprisonment without the possibility of parole, though this sentence was eventually overturned. In January 2001, when Tate was 13, he was convicted of first-degree murder for the 1999 battering death of six-year-old Tiffany Eunick in Broward County, Florida.

Murder
On July 28, 1999, Tate was left alone with Eunick, who was being babysat by Tate's mother, Kathleen Grossett-Tate. While the children were downstairs playing, Tate's mother called to them to be quiet. Tate came up 45 minutes later to say that Eunick was not breathing. He said that while they were wrestling, he had her in a headlock and the child's head hit a table. Only Eunick and Grossett-Tate were present when this occurred.

Conviction
Tate was convicted of killing Eunick by stomping on her so forcefully that her liver was lacerated. Her legs, feet, and neck all had serious bruises; an example of the amount of force used on her was similar to bruises from that of a speeding car. Her other injuries included a fractured skull, fractured rib, and swollen brain. These injuries were characterized by the prosecution as "similar to those she would have sustained by falling from a three-story building." In sentencing Tate to life imprisonment, Judge Joel T. Lazarus of Broward County Circuit Court said that "The acts of Lionel Tate were not the playful acts of a child [...] The acts of Lionel Tate were cold, callous and indescribably cruel."

Felony murder rule 
Florida Statutes required the jury to convict Tate of first-degree murder even if the jury did not believe that he intended to kill or injure anyone—all that was required was that Tate knowingly abused another child who died as a result, as any intentional act that could reasonably be expected to result in physical injury to a child is child abuse per Florida statutes. The rule for such convictions is known as the felony murder rule. The sufficient conditions of the felony murder rule were listed by the judge Joel T. Lazarus during sentencing. Therefore, Tate was sentenced to life in prison without the prosecution having to prove that he intended to kill or injure, or realized that his acts are likely to kill or injure, or even that a typical child of his age would or should realize this.

Critics, such as the various groups listed in the amicus brief attached to Tate's appeal, assert that convicting preteen children of first-degree murder without having to prove these children intended any harm, not to mention serious injury or death, is unacceptable.

Sentence
The sentence was controversial because Tate was 12 years old at the time of the murder, and his victim was 6. He was the youngest person in modern US history to be sentenced to life imprisonment, bringing broad criticism on the treatment of juvenile offenders in the justice system of the state of Florida.

Original sentence overturned
After the conviction, the prosecution openly joined Tate's plea for leniency in sentencing and even offered to help in his appeal. The trial judge criticized the prosecution for compromising the integrity of the adversarial system, and said that if the prosecution felt that life imprisonment was not warranted, they should not have charged him with murder in the first place.

In January 2004, a state appeals court overturned his conviction on the basis that his mental competency had not been evaluated before trial. This opened the way for Tate to accept the same plea deal he originally turned down, and he was released on one year's house arrest and 10 years' probation.

Armed robbery arrest and subsequent plea bargain
On May 23, 2005, Tate was charged with armed burglary with battery, armed robbery, and violation of probation, the Broward County Sheriff's Office said.

Tate threatened Domino's Pizza deliveryman Walter Ernest Gallardo with a handgun outside a friend's apartment after phoning in an order. Gallardo dropped the four pizzas and fled the scene. Tate then re-entered the apartment, assaulting the occupant who did not want Tate inside.

Gallardo called 911 upon reaching the Domino's store and returned to identify Tate, the sheriff's office said in a statement, but no gun was recovered.

On March 1, 2006, Tate accepted a plea bargain and was to be sentenced to 30 years' imprisonment in a sentencing hearing in April 2006. Tate admitted that he had violated probation by possessing a gun during the May 23 violent robbery, but he has refused to answer questions about where he got and later disposed of the gun. He was allowed to withdraw his guilty plea for robbery but was finally sentenced to 30 years in prison on May 18, 2006 for violating probation. On October 24, 2007, Florida's 4th District Court of Appeal upheld that sentence.

On February 19, 2008, Tate pled no contest to the robbery and was sentenced to 10 years in state prison. The sentence will run concurrently with his 30-year sentence for violating his probation. Tate is currently imprisoned in the Charlotte Correctional Institution.

References

External links
 Article on Tate's original sentencing
 Free Lionel Tate

1987 births
20th-century African-American people
21st-century African-American people
American murderers of children
American people convicted of murder
American prisoners sentenced to life imprisonment
Male murderers
American male criminals
American robbers
Living people
Minors convicted of murder
People convicted of murder by Florida
People from Broward County, Florida
Prisoners sentenced to life imprisonment by Florida
Criminals from Florida